FlowBack is a five-member Japanese boy band comprising Tatsuki, Judai, Masaharu, Mark and Reiji, signed to Ki/oon Music. In 2013, they auditioned and the next year they took part in the biggest audition of the nation, Line Audition, involving 125k groups, and were chosen as one of the eight finalists, which gained them attention. Between the years 2017-18, FlowBack was able to come back with fresher beats and modern day J-Pop/Hip-hop music which made them stand out in a more unique way for today's audience.

Since their debut with "Come a Long Way", they have had hits in the weekly Oricon charts and have gone on to release a full album.

Discography

Albums

Studio albums

Extended plays

Singles

As lead artist

Members
Profile based on official website

References

External links
  
 FlowBack at Oricon 

Japanese boy bands
Japanese idol groups
Japanese pop music groups